WCSS (1490 AM) is a commercial radio station broadcasting a full service oldies and classic hits radio format. Licensed to Amsterdam, New York, the station serves the Mohawk Valley, with radio studios in the Riverfront Center Mall in that city's downtown.

The station is owned by Cranesville Block Co., Inc. and features programming from Westwood One's Good Time Oldies Network and ABC Radio News. The station is part of the Buffalo Bills Radio Network and also carries a local swap-shop program.

WCSS is powered at 1,000 watts, non-directional.  Programming is also heard on FM translator W295CZ at 106.9 MHz.

History
The station first signed on in 1948.

References

External links
FCC History Cards for WCSS
WCSS Facebook

CSS
Radio stations established in 1948
Classic hits radio stations in the United States